The Lords may refer to:

 The British House of Lords
 The Lords (German band), German beat group
 The Lords (Las Vegas band)
 The Lords (demogroup), a Dutch ZX Spectrum group

See also 
 The Lord (disambiguation)